

The Beeson MB.26 was a French sesquiplane floatplane designed by Marcel Besson as a shipborne two-seat reconnaissance aircraft for the French Navy, but it was not ordered into production.

Design and development
The MB.26 was a W-strut wing braced sesquiplane, the upper wing was attached at the top of the fuselage and the lower was below the fuselage. It had one main float under the lower wing and two stabilizing floats on the wingtips. This HB.2 variant was followed by a modified C.2 configuration to turn it into a two-seat fighter seaplane. The C.2 had a new round-sided fuselage, the HB.2 had a slab-sided fuselage, and a new tailplane. Neither variant was ordered or entered production.

Variants
MB.26 HB.2
Two-seat reconnaissance seaplane variant.
MB.26 C.2
Two-seat fighter seaplane variant.

Operators

French Navy

Specifications (HB.2)

See also

References

Notes

Bibliography

1920s French military reconnaissance aircraft
Floatplanes
Sesquiplanes
Single-engined tractor aircraft